The 1965 Rice Owls football team represented Rice University during the 1965 NCAA University Division football season. In its 26th season under head coach Jess Neely, the team compiled a 2–8 record, tied for last place in the conference, and was outscored by a total of 248 to 123. The team played its home games at Rice Stadium in Houston.

The team's statistical leaders included David Ferguson with 584 passing yards, Lester Lehman with 422 rushing yards, Murphy Davis with 360 receiving yards, and Chuck Latourette with 30 points scored. Tackle Jim Vining was selected by the Associated Press (AP) as a first-team player on the 1965 All-Southwest Conference football team.

Schedule

References

Rice
Rice Owls football seasons
Rice Owls football